Entering the season as the three-time defending World Series champions, the Oakland Athletics' 1975 season involved the A's winning their fifth consecutive American League West title with a record of 98 wins and 64 losses. They went on to play the Boston Red Sox in the 1975 American League Championship Series, losing in three straight games.

Offseason 
After the Athletics' victory over the Los Angeles Dodgers in the 1974 World Series under Alvin Dark, pitcher Catfish Hunter filed a grievance. He won the American League Cy Young Award in 1974 with a record of 25–12 and a league-leading 2.49 earned run average. Hunter uncovered a violation of his contract with A's owner Charlie Finley and the team that allowed him to become a free agent. The A's were to send half of Hunter's $100,000 annual salary to a North Carolina bank as payment on an annuity, but Finley did not comply.

On December 13, 1974, arbitrator Peter Seitz ruled in Hunter's favor. As a result, Hunter became a free agent, and signed a contract with the New York Yankees for the 1975 season. Despite the loss of Hunter, the A's repeated as A.L. West champions in 1975, but lost the ALCS to Boston in a 3-game sweep.

The Athletics led the league in arbitration filings with 13. Seven players settled before their hearings.

Notable transactions 
 October 23, 1974: Manny Trillo, Darold Knowles and Bob Locker were traded by the Athletics to the Chicago Cubs for Billy Williams.
 October 23, 1974: Dan Ford and Dennis Myers (minors) were traded by the Athletics to the Minnesota Twins for Pat Bourque.
 November 11, 1974: Dal Maxvill was released by the Athletics.
 December 2, 1974: Tim Hosley was drafted from the Athletics by the Chicago Cubs in the 1974 rule 5 draft.
 January 9, 1975: Rob Picciolo was drafted by the Athletics in the 1st round (4th pick) of the 1975 Major League Baseball Draft (Secondary Phase).
 March 28, 1975: Jesús Alou was released by the Athletics.

Regular season 
At the All-Star Break, there were discussions of Bowie Kuhn's reappointment. Finley, New York owner George Steinbrenner and Baltimore owner Jerry Hoffberger were part of a group that wanted him gone. Finley was trying to convince the new owner of the Texas Rangers Brad Corbett that MLB needed a more dynamic commissioner. During the vote, Baltimore and New York decided to vote in favor of the commissioner's reappointment.
By July 14, the Athletics had won 55 games, compared to 32 losses. Seven Athletics had been named to the All-Star Game.
August 18, 1975: Charlie Finley was on the cover of Time magazine. It would be his last major profile in a national publication.

Relocation plans 
Finley received numerous offers for the Athletics. Horse owner Marge Everett wanted to purchase the team and relocate them to Seattle. Former San Francisco Giants manager Herman Franks led a group of 15 investors who had offered more than $15 million.
Finley openly criticized fans for the lack of attendance. There were rumours of possible relocation to New Orleans, Seattle, and Toronto. In addition, there was talk of an ownership group relocating the San Francisco Giants to Toronto, with the possibility that Oakland would have the entire Bay Area to itself.
In 1975, fed up with poor attendance in Oakland during the team's championship years, Finley pondered relocating the team. When Seattle filed a lawsuit against Major League Baseball over the move of the Seattle Pilots to Milwaukee, Finley and others came up with an elaborate shuffle which would move the ailing Chicago White Sox to Seattle. White Sox owner John Allyn was broke and placed under enormous pressure from fellow owners to sell his club to Seattle interests and undercut a lawsuit which Seattle had against them. As Charlie Finley had business interests in Chicago, he was prepared to move the Athletics to Chicago and be closer to his home in LaPorte, Indiana. Due to his 20-year lease with the city of Oakland (to expire in 1987), Finley was blocked. The scheme fell through when Arthur Allyn sold the White Sox to another colorful owner, Bill Veeck, who was not interested in leaving Chicago.

Season standings

Record vs. opponents

Notable transactions 
 April 6, 1975: The Athletics sent a player to be named later and cash to the Chicago Cubs for Jim Todd. The Athletics completed the deal by sending Champ Summers to the Cubs on April 29.
 May 20, 1975: Blue Moon Odom and cash were traded by the Athletics to the Cleveland Indians for Dick Bosman and Jim Perry.
 June 3, 1975: Denny Walling was drafted in the 1st round (1st pick) of the Secondary Phase of the 1975 Major League Baseball Draft.
 June 18, 1975: Brian Kingman was signed as an amateur free agent by the Athletics.
 August 29, 1975: Dal Maxvill was signed as a free agent by the Athletics.
 September 15, 1975: Rick Ingalls (minors) was traded by the Athletics to the Kansas City Royals for Mark Williams.

Roster

Player stats

Batting

Starters by position 
Note: Pos = Position; G = Games played; AB = At bats; H = Hits; Avg. = Batting average; HR = Home runs; RBI = Runs batted in

Other batters 
Note: G = Games played; AB = At bats; H = Hits; Avg. = Batting average; HR = Home runs; RBI = Runs batted in

Pitching

Starting pitchers 
Note: G = Games pitched; IP = Innings pitched; W = Wins; L = Losses; ERA = Earned run average; SO = Strikeouts

Other pitchers 
Note: G = Games pitched; IP = Innings pitched; W = Wins; L = Losses; ERA = Earned run average; SO = Strikeouts

Relief pitchers 
Note: G = Games pitched; W = Wins; L = Losses; SV = Saves; ERA = Earned run average; SO = Strikeouts

Farm system

References

External links
1975 Oakland Athletics team page at Baseball Reference
1975 Oakland Athletics team page at www.baseball-almanac.com

Oakland Athletics seasons
Oakland Athletics season
American League West champion seasons
Oakland